Love Studio is a 2016 Chinese romance comedy film directed by Cheng Zhonghao and Wang Kai. It was released in China by Shanghai Kaiyi Entertainment on March 11, 2016.

Plot

Cast
Jiang Chao
Cica Zhou
Li Meng
Alan Yu
Mandy Lee
Zhang Lei
Qi Em
Hei Ge

Reception
The film has grossed  at the Chinese box office.

References

Chinese romantic comedy films
2016 romantic comedy films